Hengyang–Liuzhou intercity railway is a high-speed railway in South-Western China, connecting Hunan and Guangxi provinces. It provides a high-speed connection with the Beijing–Guangzhou–Shenzhen–Hong Kong High-Speed Railway and links with the Guangxi capital of Nanning via the Liuzhou–Nanning intercity railway. It gives a direct high-speed services from Beijing to Guilin in only 10 hours.

History
Construction commenced in 2009 and was completed in May 2013. It was opened for service on 28 December 2013.

Route
It departs from the Beijing–Guangzhou–Shenzhen–Hong Kong High-Speed Railway at Hengyang East Railway Station, it then travels west through the major cities of Yongzhou, Guilin and arriving at Liuzhou.

Notes

High-speed railway lines in China
Railway lines opened in 2013